Matsubara, Osaka is a city in Japan.

Matsubara may also refer to:

Matsubara (surname), a Japanese surname
Miho no Matsubara, scenic area on the Miho Peninsula in Shimizu Ward of Shizuoka City, Japan
Matsubara frequency, in thermal quantum field theory, the summation over discrete imaginary frequency
Sociedade Esportiva Matsubara, a Brazilian football club

See also
Matsubara Station (disambiguation)